This is a list of notable sportspeople from the Russian Federation, Soviet Union, Russian Empire, and other Russian predecessor states, including ethnic Russians and people of other ethnicities. This list also includes those who were born in Russia but later emigrated, and those who were born elsewhere but immigrated to the country.

For the full plain list of Russian sportspeople on Wikipedia, see :Category:Russian sportspeople.

Alpine skiing
 Svetlana Gladysheva, Olympic silver medalist and World Championship bronze medalist
 Aleksandr Khoroshilov, Olympic skier
 Sergei Maitakov, 3rd place at the world junior ski championships
 Yevgeniya Sidorova, Olympic bronze medalist
 Varvara Zelenskaya, World Cup skier
 Aleksandr Zhirov, World Cup skier

American football
Charles Goldenberg
Ace Gutowsky

Archery
 Andrey Abramov, Olympic archer
 Bair Badënov, Olympic bronze medalist, 1st place at the European championships
 Natalia Bolotova, 2nd place at the world championships
 Miroslava Dagbaeva, Olympic archer
 Elena Dostay, Olympic archer
 Natalia Erdyniyeva, 3rd place at the world championships
 Margarita Galinovskaya, Olympic archer
 Boris Isachenko, Olympic silver medalist
 Dmitry Nevmerzhitsky, Olympic archer
 Balzhinima Tsyrempilov, 2nd place the world championships, 1st place at the European championships
 Vladimir Yesheyev, Olympic bronze medalist

Arm wrestling
Alexey Voyevoda

Athletics

Aleksandr Aksinin
Natalya Antyukh
Pyotr Bolotnikov
Olga Bondarenko
Valeriy Borchin
Yuriy Borzakovskiy
Lyudmila Bragina
Valeriy Brumel
Yuliya Chermoshanskaya
Anna Chicherova
Nadezhda Chizhova
Aleksandra Fedoriva
Gulnara Samitova-Galkina
Tatyana Goyshchik
Yuliya Gushchina
Yelena Isinbayeva
Vyacheslav Ivanenko
Olga Kaniskina
Tatyana Kazankina
Sergey Kirdyapkin
Vladimir Kiselyov
Sergey Klyugin
Vera Komisova
Lyudmila Kondratyeva
Vera Krepkina
Svetlana Krivelyova
Vladimir Krylov
Olga Kuzenkova
Elena Lashmanova
Tatyana Lebedeva
Mikhail Linge
Natalya Lisovskaya
Sergey Litvinov (born 1958), Olympic hammer thrower
Sergey Litvinov (born 1986), his son
Tatyana Lysenko
Viktor Markin
Svetlana Masterkova
Irina Nazarova
Olga Nazarova
Yelena Nikolayeva
Liliya Nurutdinova
Andrey Perlov
Yevgeniya Polyakova
Nina Ponomaryova
Irina Privalova
Andrey Prokofyev
Viktor Rashchupkin
Yelena Romanova
Yelena Ruzina
Natalya Sadova
Mariya Savinova
Marina Shmonina
Lyudmila Shevtsova
Nikolay Sidorov
Andrey Silnov
Yelena Slesarenko
Leonid Spirin
Maksim Tarasov
Ivan Ukhov
Valentina Yegorova
Yelena Yelesina
Yuliya Zaripova
Galina Zybina

Badminton
 Ekaterina Ananina, Russian national champion
 Andrei Antropov, Olympic badminton player
 Ella Diehl, Russian national champion, Scottish International Open, & two-time Irish International winner
 Vladimir Ivanov, European doubles champion
 Sergey Ivlev, Russian national champion
 Irina Ruslyakova, Olympic badminton player
 Anastasia Russkikh, Russian national champion
 Valeria Sorokina, Olympic bronze medalist, European champion
 Ivan Sozonov, European doubles champion
 Nina Vislova, Olympic bronze medalist, European champion
 Marina Yakusheva, Olympic badminton player
Misha Zilberman, Israeli Olympic badminton player
 Nikolai Zuyev, Olympic badminton player

Bandy
 Vsevolod Blinkov, Russian national champion
 Mikhail Butusov, Russian national champion
 Nikolay Durakov, won the Bandy World Championship seven times
 Valeri Maslov, won the Bandy World Championship eight times
 Sergey Obukhov, Bandy World Cup, Champions Cup winner
 Vladimir Savdunin, Russian national champion
 Sergei Solovyov, Russian national champion

Baseball
 Eddie Ainsmith, Played for various Major League Baseball teams
 Victor Cole, Played for the Kansas City Royals
 Jake Livingstone, Played for the New York Yankees
 Victor Starffin, First professional pitcher in Japan to win three hundred games

Basketball

 Svetlana Abrosimova, Olympic bronze medalist
 Anna Arkhipova, Olympic bronze medalist
 Olga Arteshina, Olympic bronze medalist
 Ruslan Avleev, Olympic basketball player
 Dmitri Gontcharov, Professional basketball player
 Elena Baranova, Olympic gold medalist
 Rasim Başak, Professional basketball player
 Sergei Bazarevich, 2nd place at the World championships, 2nd place at the European championships, played in the NBA
 Sergei Belov, Olympic gold medalist, two-time World champion, four-time European champion
 Sergei Bykov, European basketball champion
 Sergei Chikalkin, Russian national champion
 Ivan Chiriaev, Professional basketball player
 Aleksandr Dedushkin, Professional basketball player
 Fedor Dmitriev, Russian national champion
 Dmitri Domani, Professional basketball player
 Ivan Dvorny, Olympic gold medalist
 Andrei Fetisov, Professional basketball player
 Dmitry Flis, Professional basketball player
 Vitaly Fridzon, Professional basketball player
 Diana Goustilina, Olympic bronze medalist
 Becky Hammon, Olympic bronze medalist
 Travis Hansen, Professional basketball player
 Jon Robert Holden, Professional basketball player
 Maria Kalmykova, Olympic bronze medalist
 Vasily Karasev, 2nd place the World Championships, 2nd place at the European Championships
 Elena Karpova, Olympic bronze medalist
 Marina Karpunina, Olympic bronze medalist
 Anatoly Kashirov, Professional basketball player
 Sasha Kaun, Professional basketball player
 Victor Keyru, Professional basketball player
 Dmitri Khvostov, Professional basketball player
 Viktor Khryapa, European basketball champion
 Andrei Kirilenko, Professional basketball player, NBA All-Star
 Evgeny Kolesnikov, Professional basketball player
 Anatoly Konev, Olympic silver medalist, three-time European champion
 Yaroslav Korolev, Professional basketball player
 Ilona Korstin, Olympic bronze medalist
 Nikita Kurbanov, Professional basketball player
 Marina Kuzina, Olympic bronze medalist
 Fedor Likholitov, Professional basketball player
 Yekaterina Lisina, Olympic bronze medalist
 Kelly McCarty, Professional basketball player
 Cyrille Makanda, Professional basketball player
 Kelly Miller, Professional basketball player
 Sergei Monia, European basketball champion
 Nikita Morgunov, 2nd place at the World Championships, European basketball champion
 Timofey Mozgov, Professional basketball player
 Can Maxim Mutaf, Professional basketball player
 Anatoly Myshkin, Olympic bronze medalist, World champion, European champion
 Irina Osipova, Olympic bronze medalist
 Yuri Ozerov, Olympic silver medalist, European basketball champion
 Nikolay Padius, European basketball champion
 Svetlana Pankratova, professional basketball player
 Sergei Panov, 2nd place at the World Championships, 2nd place at the European Championships
 Evgeniy Pashutin, Professional basketball player
 Zakhar Pashutin, 2nd place at the World Championships, European basketball champion
 Alexander Petrenko, Professional basketball player
 Kirill Pichshalnikov, Professional basketball player
 Pavel Podkolzin, Professional basketball player
 Anton Ponkrashov, Professional basketball player
 Epiphanny Prince, Professional basketball player
 Oxana Rakhmatulina, Olympic bronze medalist
 Petr Samoylenko, Professional basketball player
 Aleksey Savrasenko, European basketball champion
 Nikita Shabalkin, Professional basketball player
 Tatiana Shchegoleva, Olympic bronze medalist
 Alexey Shved, Professional basketball player
 Dmitri Sokolov, Professional basketball player
 Irina Sokolovskaya, Olympic bronze medalist
 Maria Stepanova, Olympic bronze medalist
 Ilja Syrovatko, Professional basketball player
 Sergei Tarakanov, Olympic gold medalist, World champion, European basketball champion
 Yuri Vasiliev, Professional basketball player
 Viktor Vlasov, Olympic silver medalist, European basketball champion
 Natalia Vodopyanova, Olympic bronze medalist
 Gennadi Volnov, Olympic gold medalist, World champion, European basketball champion
 Evgeny Voronov, Professional basketball player
 Andrey Vorontsevich, Professional basketball player
 Egor Vyaltsev, OProfessional basketball player
 Olga Yakovleva, Professional basketball player
 Artem Zabelin, Professional basketball player
 Alexey Zhukanenko, Professional basketball player
 Aleksei Zozulin, Professional basketball player

Beach volleyball
 Dmitri Barsouk, Olympic volleyball player, World Championship silver medalist
 Igor Kolodinsky, Olympic volleyball player, World Championship silver medalist
 Alexandra Shiryayeva, Olympic volleyball player, European volleyball champion
 Natalya Uryadova, Olympic volleyball player, European volleyball champion

Biathlon

 Albina Akhatova, Olympic gold medalist, World biathlon champion
 Anna Bogaliy-Titovets, Olympic gold medalist, World biathlon champion
 Anna Boulygina, Olympic gold medalist, World biathlon champion
 Anna Burmistrova, Olympic gold medalist, World biathlon champion
 Svetlana Tchernusova, World biathlon champion
 Vladimir Drachev, Olympic silver medalist, World biathlon champion
 Rustam Garifoullin, Olympic gold medalist, World biathlon champion
 Natalia Guseva, Olympic bronze medalist, World biathlon champion
 Ekaterina Iourieva, World biathlon champion
 Maria Iovleva, Olympic gold medalist, World biathlon champion
 Svetlana Ishmouratova, Olympic gold medalist, World biathlon champion
 Elena Khrustaleva, Olympic gold medalist, World biathlon champion
 Valeri Kiriyenko, Olympic silver medalist, World biathlon champion
 Galina Koukleva, Olympic gold medalist, World biathlon champion
 Nikolay Kruglov, Olympic gold medalist, World biathlon champion
 Nikolay Kruglov, Jr., Olympic gold medalist, World biathlon champion
 Anastasiya Kuzmina, Olympic gold medalist, World biathlon champion
 Viktor Maigourov, Olympic bronze medalist, World biathlon champion
 Irina Malgina, Olympic gold medalist, World biathlon champion
 Valeriy Medvedtsev, Olympic gold medalist, World biathlon champion
 Olga Medvedtseva, Olympic gold medalist, World biathlon champion
 Olga Melnik, Olympic silver medalist, World biathlon champion
 Pavel Muslimov, Olympic bronze medalist
 Luiza Noskova, Olympic gold medalist, World biathlon champion
 Nikolay Polukhin, Olympic gold medalist, World biathlon champion
 Eugeni Redkine, Olympic gold medalist, World biathlon champion
 Anfisa Reztsova, Olympic gold medalist, World biathlon champion
 Yana Romanova, Professional biathlete
 Olga Romasko, Olympic silver medalist, World biathlon champion
 Pavel Rostovtsev, Professional biathlete
 Sergei Rozhkov, Professional biathlete
 Anton Shipulin, Olympic bronze medalist, World biathlon champion
 Svetlana Sleptsova, Olympic gold medalist, World biathlon champion
 Natalya Snytina, Olympic gold medalist, World biathlon champion
 Natalya Sokolova, Professional biathlete
 Nadezhda Talanova, Olympic gold medalist, World biathlon champion
 Sergei Tarasov, Olympic gold medalist, World biathlon champion
 Mikhail Terentiev, Olympic gold medalist, World biathlon champion
 Sergei Tchepikov, Olympic gold medalist, World biathlon champion
 Ivan Tcherezov, Olympic gold medalist, World biathlon champion
 Maxim Tchoudov, Olympic gold medalist, World biathlon champion
 Andrey Tokarev, Olympic gold medalist, World biathlon champion
 Evgeny Ustyugov, Olympic gold medalist, World biathlon champion
 Olga Vilukhina, Olympic silver medalist
 Dmitri Yaroshenko, World biathlon champion
 Olga Zaitseva, Olympic gold medalist, World biathlon champion
 Irek Zaripov, Olympic gold medalist, World biathlon champion

Bobsleigh

 Dmitry Abramovitch
 Konstantin Aladachvili
 Vladimir Aleksandrov
 Alexey Andryunin
 Kristina Bader
 Elena Doronina
 Olga Fyodorova
 Sergey Golubev
 Nikolay Hrenkov
 Alexey Kireev
 Alevtina Kovalenko
 Petr Moiseev
 Denis Moiseychenkov
 Alexey Negodaylo
 Roman Oreshnikov
 Evgeny Pechonkin
 Yevgeni Popov
 Sergey Prudnikov
 Alexei Seliverstov
 Anastasia Skulkina
 Kirill Sosunov
 Dmitriy Stepushkin
 Yulia Timofeeva
 Viktoria Tokovaya
 Dmitry Trunenkov
 Alexander Ushakov
 Alexey Voyevoda
 Filipp Yegorov
 Andrey Yurkov
 Alexandr Zubkov

Bodybuilding
 Varya Akulova
 Sergey Arkhipov
 Vladimir Ashcheulov
 Aleksandr Fyodorov
 Maxim Luzyanin
 Evgeny Mishin
 Konstantin Nerchenko
 Sergei Ogorodnikov
 Elena Panova
 Mikhail Sazonov
 Aziz Shavershian
 Sergey Shelestov
 Efim Shifrin
 Elena Shportun
 Ramesses Tlyakodugov
 Vladimir Turchinsky

Bowling
Maria Bulanova

Boxing

 Aleksandr Alekseyev
 Georgy Balakshin
 Denis Boytsov
 Valery Brudov
 Dmitry Bivol
 Artur Beterbiev
 Denise Inkin
 Roman Karmazin
 Sergey Kazakov
 Matvey Korobov
 Alexander Maletin
 Egor Mekhontsev
 Dmitry Pirog
 Aleksandr Povetkin
 Roman Romanchuk
 Oleg Saitov
 Aleksei Tishchenko
 Kostya Tszyu
 Nikolai Valuev
 Sergey Vodopyanov
 Andrey Zamkovoy
 Roman Zentsov

Bridge
Irina Levitina

Chess

 Alexander Alekhine
 Ekaterina Atalik
 Mikhail Botvinnik
 Elisabeth Bykova
 Dmitry Jakovenko
 Anatoly Karpov
 Garry Kasparov
 Alexandra Kosteniuk
 Vladimir Kramnik
 Boris Maliutin
 Vasily Smyslov
 Artyom Timofeev
 Sergey Volkov

Canoeing

Aleksandr Artemida
Sergey Chemerov
Viktor Denisov
Yevgeniy Dorokhin
Alexander Dyachenko
Konstantin Fomichev
Sergey Gaikov
Vitaly Galkov
Vitaliy Gankin
Nina Gopova
Oleg Gorobiy
Natalya Gouilly
Evgeny Ignatov
Vladimir Grushikhin
Aleksandr Ivanik
Andrey Kabanov
Maria Kazakova
Sergey Khovanskiy
Artem Kononuk
Andrey Konovalov
Pavel Konovalov
Sergey Kosilov
Larissa Kosorukova
Olga Kostenko
Aleksandr Kostoglod
Ignat Kovalev
Aleksandr Vladimirovich Kovalyov
Galina Kreft
Roman Kruglyakov
Danila Kuznetsov
Mikhail Kuznetsov
Vladimir Ladosha
Dmitry Larionov
Anton Lazko
Alexander Lipatov
Nikolay Lipkin
Natalia Lobova
Vasiliy Mailov
Ilya Medvedev
Viktor Melantev
Alexander Nikolaev
Maxim Opalev
Stepan Oshchepkov
Anastasia Panchenko
Mikhail Pavlov
Aleksandra Perova
Pavel Petrov
Vladislav Polzounov
Galina Poryvayeva
Natalia Proskurina
Anton Ryakhov
Yuliana Salakhova
Yevgeny Salakhov
Irina Salomykova
Anastasia Sergeeva
Andrey Shchegolikhin
Stephan Shevchuk
Andrey Shkiotov
Ivan Shtyl
Tatyana Tischenko
Anatoli Tishchenko
Olga Tishchenko
Andrey Tissin
Yelena Tissina
Denys Tourtchenkov
Sergey Tsibuinikov
Georgiy Tsybulnikov
Sergey Ulegin
Anton Vasilev
Sergey Verlin
Aleksandr Vinogradov
Konstantin Vishnyakov
Aleskey Volkinskiy
Alexey Volkonsky
Mikhail Zamotin
Roman Zarubin
Viktor Zavolskiy

Cross-country skiing

Ivan Alypov
Nikolay Anikin
Natalia Baranova-Masalkina
Nikolay Bazhukov
Yevgeny Belyayev
Yuliya Chepalova
Olga Danilova
Yevgeny Dementyev
Mikhail Devyatyarov
Nina Gavrilyuk
Mikhail Ivanov
Irina Khazova
Pavel Kolchin
Natalya Korostelyova
Nikita Kriukov
Larisa Kurkina
Vladimir Kuzin
Larisa Lazutina
Alexander Legkov
Yevgeniya Medvedeva
Nikolay Morilov
Alexander Panzhinskiy
Alexei Petukhov
Vasily Rochev
Alyona Sidko
Fyodor Simashev
Yuri Skobov
Fyodor Terentyev
Yelena Välbe
Vyacheslav Vedenin
Vladimir Voronkov
Lyubov Yegorova
Nikolay Zimyatov

Curling
Andrey Drozdov
Nkeirouka Ezekh
Margarita Fomina
Ekaterina Galkina
Jason Gunnlaugson
Olga Jarkova
Liudmila Privivkova
Anna Sidorova
Anastassia Skoultan

Cycling
Tamilla Abassova
Viatcheslav Ekimov
Oksana Grishina
Eduard Gritsun
Mikhail Ignatiev
Irina Kalentieva
Alexandr Kolobnev
Nikolay Kuznetsov
Alexei Markov
Anton Shantyr
Olga Slyusareva
Olga Zabelinskaya
Zulfiya Zabirova

Darts
Irina Armstrong
Anastasia Dobromyslova
Roman Konchikov

Diving

Inga Afonina
Aleksandr Dobroskok
Dmitriy Dobroskok
Gleb Galperin
Natalia Mikhaylovna Goncharova
Vera Ilyina
Yulia Koltunova
Yuriy Kunakov
Irina Lashko
Igor Lukashin
Yelena Miroshina
Alexey Molchanov
Yuliya Pakhalina
Anastasia Pozdniakova
Nadezhda Bazhina
Dmitri Sautin
Vladimir Timoshinin
Aliaksandr Varlamau

Draughts
Alexander Baljakin
Alexei Chizhov
Alexander Georgiev
Vladimir Kaplan
Alex Moiseyev
Rashid Nezhmetdinov
Alexander Schwarzman
Tamara Tansykkuzhina

Electronic sports
Ivan Demidov

Equestrians
Grand Duke Dmitri Pavlovich of Russia
Vladimir Littauer
Karol Rómmel

Fencing
Karina Aznavourian
Svetlana Boyko
Inna Deriglazova
Kamilla Gafurzianova
Pavel Kolobkov
Larisa Korobeynikova
Nikolay Kovalev
Yevgeniya Lamonova
Tatiana Logounova
Viktoria Nikishina
Aida Shanayeva
Anna Sivkova
Sofiya Velikaya
Aleksey Yakimenko
Oksana Yermakova

Field hockey
Minneula Azizov
Valeri Belyakov
Viktor Deputatov
Aleksandr Goncharov
Aleksandr Gusev
Sergei Klevtsov
Viacheslav Lampeev
Aleksandr Miasnikov
Mikhail Nichepurenko
Leonid Pavlovski
Sergei Pleshakov
Vladimir Pleshakov
Tatyana Shvyganova
Aleksandr Sychyov
Galina Vyuzhanina
Oleg Zagorodnev
Farit Zigangirov

Figure skating

Ilia Averbukh
Elena Bechke
Ludmila Belousova
Elena Berezhnaya
Natalia Bestemianova
Ekaterina Bobrova
Andrei Bukin
Maria Butyrskaya
Marina Cherkasova
Sergei Chetverukhin
Artur Dmitriev
Oksana Domnina
Artur Gachinski
Ekaterina Gordeeva
Aleksandr Gorelik
Aleksandr Gorshkov
Sergei Grinkov
Oksana Grishuk
Elena Ilinykh
Kira Ivanova
Nikita Katsalapov
Oksana Kazakova
Fedor Klimov
Marina Klimova
Anjelika Krylova
Ilia Kulik
Roman Kostomarov
Aliona Kostornaia
Vladimir Kovalev
Maxim Kovtun
Natalia Linichuk
Yulia Lipnitskaya
Irina Lobacheva
Oleg Makarov
Maxim Marinin
Andrei Minenkov
Alexei Mishin
Natalia Mishkutenok
Irina Moiseeva
Tamara Moskvina
Tatiana Navka
Oleg Ovsyannikov
Lyudmila Pakhomova
Nikolai Panin
Denis Petrov
Evgeni Platov
Evgeni Plushenko
Sergei Ponomarenko
Oleg Protopopov
Irina Rodnina
Larisa Selezneva
Maxim Shabalin
Sergei Shakhrai
Anna Shcherbakova
Anton Sikhuralidze
Irina Slutskaya
Lyudmila Smirnova
Elena Sokolova
Dmitri Soloviev
Adelina Sotnikova
Ksenia Stolbova
Andrei Suraikin
Tatiana Totmianina
Maxim Trankov
Elizaveta Tuktamysheva
Eteri Georgijewna Tutberidse
Alexandra Trusova
Alexei Ulanov
Alexei Urmanov
Maya Usova
Kamila Valieva
Elena Valova
Oleg Vasiliev
Viktoria Volchkova
Tatiana Volosozhar
Alexei Yagudin
Alexander Zaitsev
Tatyana Zhuk
Alexander Zhulin

Football (soccer)
Igor Akinfeev
Eugeny Aldonin
Andrei Arshavin
Aleksandr Deryomov (1949–2004)
Alan Dzagoev
Sergey Ignashevich
Aleksandr Nikolayevich Martynov
Erast Osipyan
Roman Pavlyuchenko
Andrei Suvorov (1887–1917)
Lev Yashin
Dmitri Zhdanov
Yury Zhirkov
Aleksandr Golovin
Aleksei Miranchuk
Denis Cheryshev
Aleksandr Kerzhakov
Artem Dzyuba
Aleksandr Kokorin

Freestyle skiing
Marina Cherkasova (skier)
Egor Korotkov
Yelizaveta Kozhevnikova
Vladimir Lebedev
Dmitry Marushchak
Daria Serova
Sergey Shupletsov
Alexandr Smyshlyaev

Go
Alexandre Dinerchtein
Svetlana Shikshina

Golf
Svetlana Gounkina
Maria Kostina
Maria Verchenova

Gymnastics

Denis Ablyazin
Ksenia Afanasyeva
Nikolai Andrianov
David Belyavskiy
Aliya Mustafina
Svetlana Khorkina
Viktoria Komova
Tatiana Nabieva
Yelena Produnova
Elena Zamolodchikova
Evgenia Kanaeva
Irina Tchachina
Alina Kabaeva
Daria Dmitrieva
Yanina Batyrchina
Yana Kudryavtseva
Amina Zaripova
Oxana Kostina
Daria Kondakova
Margarita Mamun
Olga Kapranova
Ksenia Dudkina
Yelena Posevina
Anastasia Nazarenko
Alexei Nemov
Emin Garibov
Nikolai Kuksenkov
Vera Sessina
Galina Shugurova
Yuri Titov
Or Tokayev, Israeli Olympic rhythmic gymnast

Handball

Yekaterina Andryushina
Irina Bliznova
Mikhail Chipurin
Yelena Dmitriyeva
Dmitry Filippov
Aleksandr Gorbatikov
Vyacheslav Gorpishin
Vitali Ivanov
Anna Kareyeva
Oleg Khodkov
Eduard Koksharov
Alexey Kostygov
Denis Krivoshlykov
Vasily Kudinov
Oleg Kuleshov
Stanislav Kulinchenko
Dmitry Kuzelev
Andrey Lavrov
Igor Lavrov
Yekaterina Marennikova
Sergey Pogorelov
Yelena Polenova
Irina Poltoratskaya
Lyudmila Postnova
Alexey Rastvortsev
Oxana Romenskaya
Natalia Shipilova
Maria Sidorova
Pavel Sukosyan
Inna Suslina
Dmitri Torgovanov
Aleksandr Tuchkin
Emiliya Turey
Yana Uskova
Lev Voronin

Ice hockey

Kirill Kaprizov
Maxim Afinogenov
Maria Batalova
Ilya Bryzgalov
Pavel Bure
Valeri Bure
Pavel Datsyuk
Vitaly Davydov
Sergei Fedorov
Viacheslav Fetisov
Irina Gashennikova
Sergei Gonchar
Denis Gurianov
Alexei Gusarov
Valeri Kamensky
Alexandra Kapustina
Alexander Karpovtsev
Alexei Kasatonov
Darius Kasparaitis
Nikolai Khabibulin
Valeri Kharlamov
Vladimir Konstantinov
Ilya Kovalchuk
Andrei Kovalenko
Alexei Kovalev
Vyacheslav Kozlov
Igor Kravchuk
Vladimir Krutov
Igor Larionov
Yekaterina Lebedeva
Sergei Makarov
Evgeni Malkin
Aleksandr Maltsev
Andrei Markov
Boris Mironov
Dmitri Mironov
Boris Mikhailov
Elina Mitrofanova
Alexander Mogilny
Aleksey Morozov
Evgeni Nabokov
Sergei Nemchinov
Andrei Nikolishin
Alexander Ovechkin
Maria Pechnikova
Vladimir Vladimirovich Petrov
Anna Prugova
Alexander Radulov
Sergei Samsonov
Alexander Semin
Anna Shibanova
Anna Shukina
Yelena Silina
Olga Sosina
Andrei Svechnikov
Valeria Tarakanova
Anna Timofeyeva
German Titov
Vladislav Tretiak
Oleg Tverdovsky
Semyon Varlamov
Alexei Yashin
Anton Volchenkov
Alexei Zhitnik
Viktor Zinger
Sergei Zubov

Judo
Lyubov Bruletova
Tea Donguzashvili
Arsen Galstyan
Mansur Isaev
Tagir Khaybulaev
Vitali Kuznetsov
Vladimir Nevzorov
Serhiy Novikov
Yelena Petrova
Nikolai Solodukhin

Martial Arts
Aleksander Emelianenko
Aleksei Oleinik
Alexander Volkov
Andrey Koreshkov
Askar Askarov
Damir Ismagulov
Fedor Emelianenko
Islam Makhachev
Khabib Nurmagomedov
Magomed Ankalaev
Movsar Evloev
Petr Yan
Sergei Kharitonov
Sergei Pavlovich
Shamil Abdurakhimov
Tagir Ulanbekov
Umar Nurmagomedov
Usman Nurmagomedov
Vadim Nemkov
Valentin Moldavsky
Yana Kunitskaya
Zabit Magomedsharipov
Zubaira Tukhugov

Luge

Denis Alimov
Yuliya Anashkina
Vladislav Antonov
Yevgeny Belousov
Aleksandr Belyakov
Gennady Belyakov
Vladimir Boitsov
Sergey Danilin
Albert Demtschenko
Alexander Denisyev
Valery Dudin
Stepan Fedorov
Irina Gubkina
Tatiana Ivanova
Yuri Kharchenko
Dmitriy Khamkin
Natalia Khoreva
Viktor Kneib
Semen Kolobayev
Boris Kuryschkin
Mikhail Kuzmich
Pavel Kuzmich
Yekaterina Lavrentyeva
Ivan Lazarev (luger)
Aleksey Lebedev
Vladimir Makhnutin
Stanislav Mikheev
Roman Molvistov
Ivan Nevmerzhitski
Anastasia Oberstolz-Antonova
Lyubov Panyutina
Pyotr Popov
Pavel Porzhnev
Vladimir Prokhorov
Alexandra Rodionova
Kiril Serikov
Anastasiya Skulkina
Jury Talykh
Jury Veselov
Yuliya Vetlova
Aleksandr Yegorov
Vladislav Yuzhakov
Aleksei Zelensky
Alexandr Zubkov

Nordic skiing

Sergey Chervyakov
Vyacheslav Dryagin
Andrey Dundukov
Alexey Fadeyev
Ildar Garifullin
Nikolay Gusakov
Valeriy Kapaev
Nikolay Kiselyov
Valery Kobelev
Dmitry Kochkin
Allar Levandi
Robert Makara
Sergey Maslennikov
Alexander Mayorov
Niyaz Nabeev
Nikolay Nogovitsyn
Aleksandr Nossov
Ivan Panin (skier)
Nikolai Parfionov
Alexander Prosvirnin
Dmitry Sinitsyn
Valeri Stolyarov

Pentathlon
Andrey Moiseyev
Boris Nepokupnoy
Dmitri Svatkovskiy
Eduard Zenovka

Pool
Anastasia Luppova
Konstantin Stepanov

Professional wrestling
Salman Hashimikov
Alex Koslov
Ivan Markov
Victor Zangiev
Alexander Zass

Racing

Sergey Afanasyev
Mikhail Aleshin
Yuri Baiborodov
Aleksei Dudukalo
Nikolai Fomenko
Lev Fridman
Misha Goikhberg
Boris Ivanowski
Dimitri Jorjadze
Alessandro Vita Kouzkin
Sergei Krylov
Daniil Kvyat
Kirill Ladygin
Ivan Lukashevich
Alexander Lvov
Viktor Maslov
Nikita Mazepin
Sergey Mokshantsev
Daniil Move
Anton Nebylitskiy
Vitaly Petrov, Formula 1 driver
Andrei Romanov
Roman Rusinov
Timur Sadredinov
Ivan Samarin
Viktor Shapovalov
David Sigachev
Sergey Sirotkin
Andrey Smetsky
Max Snegirev
Konstantin Tereshchenko
Igor Troubetzkoy
Alexander Tyuryumin
Alexey Vasilyev
Evgeny Zelenov
Maxim Zimin
Sergei Zlobin

Rally
Vladimir Chagin
Firdaus Kabirov
Eduard Nikolaev
Evgeny Novikov
Leonid Novitskiy

Rowing

Aleksandr Berkutov
Valentin Boreyko
Boris Dubrovskiy
Vladimir Eshinov
Sergey Fedorovtsev
Oleg Golovanov
Yelena Khloptseva
Aleksandr Klepikov
Gennadi Korshikov
Igor Kravtsov
Mikhail Kuznetsov
Aleksandr Lukyanov
Nikolay Ivanov
Vyacheslav Ivanov
Yury Malyshev
Anatoliy Sass
Nikolay Spinyov
Aleksey Svirin
Aleksandr Timoshinin
Yuriy Tyukalov
Oleg Tyurin

Rugby league
Robert Campbell
Andrei Olari
Sam Obst
Ian Rubin

Rugby union
Vasily Artemiev
Igor Galinovskiy
B.P. Gavrilov
Kirill Kulemin
Alexander Obolensky
Alexandre Tichonov

Shooting

Yevgeni Aleinikov
Sergei Alifirenko
Alexei Alipov
Boris Andreyev
Harry Blau
Antoli Bogdanov
Vasily Borisov
Yevgeny Cherkasov
Valentina Cherkasova
Svetlana Demina
Yuri Fedkin
Lyubov Galkina
Irina Gerasimenok
Tatiana Goldobina
Vladimir Isakov
Artem Khadjibekov
Boris Kokorev
Grigory Kosykh
Olga Kuznetsova
Marina Logvinenko
Vasily Mosin
Mikhail Nestruyev
Natalia Paderina
Yevgeni Petrov
Sergei Polyakov
Sergei Pyzhianov
Viktor Shamburkin
Renart Suleymanov
Viktor Torshin
Viktor Vlasov
Aleksandr Zabelin

Short track speed skating
Viktor Ahn
Yuliya Allagulova
Tatiana Borodulina
Semion Elistratov
Vladimir Grigorev
Natalya Isakova
Viktoriya Troytskaya
Yuliya Vlasova
Ruslan Zakharov

Skeleton
Konstantin Aladachvili
Sergey Chudinov
Olga Korobkina
Yekaterina Mironova
Elena Nikitina
Aleksandr Tretyakov
Svetlana Trunova
Yelena Yudina

Ski jumping
Irina Avvakumova
Vladimir Belussov
Ildar Fatchullin
Dimitry Ipatov
Nikolay Kamenskiy
Pavel Karelin
Arthur Khamidulin
Valery Kobelev
Denis Kornilov
Ilya Rosliakov
Roman Sergeevich Trofimov
Dimitry Vassiliev

Snowboarding
Svetlana Boldykova
Stanislav Detkov
Yekaterina Ilyukhina
Nikolay Olyunin
Yuri Podladchikov
Andrey Sobolev
Yekaterina Tudegesheva
Vic Wild
Alena Zavarzina

Speed skating

Yekaterina Abramova
Tatyana Averina
Varvara Barysheva
Svetlana Bazhanova
Oleg Bozhev
Natalya Donchenko
Dmitry Dorofeyev
Olga Fatkulina
Svetlana Fedotkina
Sergey Fokichev
Natalya Glebova
Olga Graf
Yevgeny Grishin
Aleksandr Golubev
Rafayel Grach
Nikolay Gulyayev
Klara Guseva
Sergey Khlebnikov
Sergey Klevchenya
Berta Kolokoltseva
Viktor Kosichkin
Vera Krasnova
Yevgeny Kulikov
Galina Likhachova
Yekaterina Lobysheva
Vladimir Lobanov
Igor Malkov
Yuri Mikhaylov
Valery Muratov
Vladimir Orlov
Natalya Petrusyova
Tamara Rylova
Yekaterina Shikhova
Tatyana Sidorova
Boris Shilkov
Lidiya Skoblikova
Ivan Skobrev
Yuliya Skokova
Boris Stenin
Valentina Stenina
Galina Stepanskaya
Lyudmila Titova
Svetlana Vysokova
Irina Yegorova
Svetlana Zhurova

Sumo
Aran Hakutora
Hakurozan Yūta
Alan Karaev
Rohō Yukio
Wakanohō Toshinori

Swimming

Sergey Fesikov
Andrey Grechin
Larisa Ilchenko
Danila Izotov
Stanislava Komarova
Sergey Koplyakov
Andrey Korneyev
Yevgeny Korotyshkin
Marina Kosheveya
Vladislav Kulikov
Yevgeny Lagunov
Nikita Lobintsev
Vladimir Morozov
Denis Pankratov
Mikhail Polischuk
Igor Polyansky
Alexander Popov
Yevgeny Sadovyi
Vladimir Salnikov
Roman Sludnov
Alexander Sukhorukov
Arkady Vyatchanin
Yuliya Yefimova
Anastasia Zuyeva

Synchronized swimming

Yelena Antonova
Yelena Azarova
Olga Brusnikina
Anastasia Davydova
Mariya Gromova
Natalia Ishchenko
Elvira Khasyanova
Mariya Kiselyova
Olga Kuzhela
Olga Novokshchenova
Yelena Ovchinnikova
Irina Pershina
Svetlana Romashina
Olga Sedakova
Anna Shorina
Yelena Soya
Yuliya Vasilyeva
Olga Vasyukova
Anastasiya Yermakova

Table tennis
Fliura Abbate-Bulatova
Oksana Fadeyeva
Tatiana Ferdman
Svetlana Ganina
Stanislav Gomozkov
Svetlana Grinberg
Irina Kotikhina
Dmitry Mazunov
Rita Pogosova
Valentina Popova
Zoja Rudnova
Alexey Smirnov
Elena Timina

Taekwondo
Anastasia Baryshnikova
Aleksey Denisenko
Natalia Ivanova
Olga Ivanova

Tennis

 Elena Bovina
 Andrei Cherkasov
 Elena Dementieva
 Natela Dzalamidze, took on Georgian citizenship
 Yevgeny Kafelnikov
 Maria Kirilenko
 Anna Kournikova
 Svetlana Kuznetsova
 Elena Likhovtseva
 Ekaterina Makarova
 Eugenia Maniokova
 Olga Morozova
 Anastasia Myskina
 Andrei Olhovskiy
 Nadia Petrova
 Dinara Safina
 Marat Safin
 Maria Sharapova
 Vera Zvonareva
 Elena Vesnina

Triathlon

Irina Abysova
Alena Adanichkina
Nina Valentinovna Anisimova
Alexander Bryukhankov
Olga Dmitrieva
Olga Erofeeva
Olga Generalova
Lyubov Ivanovskaya
Vyacheslav Pimenov
Anastasiya Polyanskaya
Dmitry Polyanski
Igor Andreyevich Polyanski
Anastasia Protasenya
Alexandra Razarenova
Natalia Shliakhtenko
Mikhail Shubin
Arina Shulgina
Yevgeniya Sukhoruchenkova
Igor Sysoyev
Ivan Vasiliev

Volleyball

Nikolay Apalikov
Yevgeniya Artamonova
Yury Berezhko
Aleksandr Butko
Yekaterina Gamova
Yelena Godina
Sergey Grankin
Tatyana Gracheva
Dmitriy Ilinikh
Vadim Khamuttskikh
Taras Khtey
Olga Khrzhanovskaya
Anastasiya Kodirova
Inessa Korkmaz
Aleksandra Korukovets
Maxim Mikhaylov
Natalya Morozova
Dmitriy Muserskiy
Olga Nikolaeva
Aleksey Obmochaev
Yelena Plotnikova
Olga Potachova
Natalya Safronova
Marina Sheshenina
Aleksandr Sokolov
Lioubov Sokolova
Irina Tebenikhina
Sergey Tetyukhin
Elizaveta Tishchenko
Yelena Tyurina
Yelena Vasilevskaya
Aleksandr Volkov

Water polo

Anatoli Akimov
Marina Akobiya
Ekaterina Anikeeva
Aleksandr Dolgushin
Aleksandr Dreval
Yevgeny Grishin
Vadim Gulyaev
Mikhail Ivanov
Aleksandr Kabanov
Sofia Konukh
Maria Koroleva
Natalia Kutuzova
Svetlana Kuzina
Leonid Osipov
Tatiana Petrova
Yuliya Petrova
Galina Rytova
Yevgeny Sharonov
Aleksandr Shidlovsky
Elena Smurova
Viacheslav Sobchenko
Elena Tokun
Irina Tolkunova
Ekaterina Vasilieva

Weightlifting
Dmitry Berestov
Andrei Chemerkin
Zarema Kasayeva
Tatiana Kashirina
Aleksei Petrov
Valentina Popova
Marina Shainova
Oksana Slivenko
Svetlana Tsarukayeva
Nadezhda Yevstyukhina
Natalia Zabolotnaya

Wrestling

Islambek Albiev
Mavlet Batirov
Vadim Bogiyev
Khasan Baroyev
Khadjimourat Gatsalov
Murat Kardanov
Aleksandr Karelin
Alan Khugayev
Aslanbek Khushtov
Khadzhimurad Magomedov
Nazyr Mankiev
Aleksey Mishin
Shirvani Muradov
Sagid Murtazaliev
David Musuľbes
Djamal Otarsultanov
Adam Saitiev
Buvaisar Saitiev
Varteres Samourgachev
Murad Umakhanov
Roman Vlasov
Natalia Vorobieva
Abdulrashid Sadulaev

Yacht racing
Andrey Balashov
Alexandr Budnikov
Boris Budnikov
Aleksandr Muzychenko
Timir Pinegin
Eugene Platon
Nikolay Polyakov
Viktor Potapov
Dmitri Shabanov
Georgy Shayduko
Fyodor Shutkov
Igor Skalin
Eduard Skornyakov
Philipp Strauch

 
 
Russian sportspeople